This is a list of current provincial leaders in the Provinces of China, including government leaders and Communist Party Committee Secretaries (labelled Party Secretary), leading Provincial party standing committees; Directors of province-level People's Congress Standing Committees; Government chiefs (mayors, governors, chairpersons of AR, or Chief Executives of SAR); and chairpersons of province-level Chinese People's Political Consultative Conference (CPPCC) committees.

Communist Party Secretaries

Municipalities

Provinces

Autonomous Regions

Special Administrative Regions

Directors of People's Congress Standing Committee

Municipalities

Provinces

Autonomous Regions

Government chiefs

Municipalities

Provinces

Autonomous Regions

Special Administrative Regions

Chairpersons of CPPCC Committee

Municipalities

Provinces

Autonomous Regions

See also 

 Provincial party standing committee
 Ili Kazakh Autonomous Prefecture#Governors

Notes 
All government leaders in mainland are Chinese Communist Party members.
According to the Constitution of the People's Republic of China, the chairman of an autonomous region, the prefect of an autonomous prefecture or the governor of an autonomous county shall be a member of the ethnic group exercising regional autonomy in the area concerned.
A "nominated" government leader has been appointed as the government party committee secretary and nominated as the new government leader, but has not received final confirmation from the provincial people's congress.
Both Chief Executives of Hong Kong and Macau are nonpartisans.
This list excludes the leaders of claimed Taiwan Province and the fragment of Fujian Province which is being governed by the Republic of China currently.

References 

 
 Regional leader's index on CE.cn

China
Lists of political office-holders in China